The California Powder Works Bridge is a historic covered bridge in Santa Cruz, California.  It is a Smith truss bridge, built across the San Lorenzo River in 1872 by the California Powder Works, an explosives manufacturer whose factory complex stood on the river banks.  The bridge was designated a National Historic Landmark in 2015 as one of the best-preserved national examples of the Smith truss.  It is owned and maintained by the Paradise Park Masonic Club, and is open to pedestrian and vehicular traffic, with a posted weight limit of 5 tons.

Description and history
The bridge carries Keystone Way, a private road in the residential development known as the Paradise Park Masonic Club. Its trusses are built out of Douglas fir, and its roof is corrugated metal. The exterior is clad in vertical board-and-batten siding.

The bridge was constructed by the Pacific Bridge Company, its major elements manufactured at a plant in Alameda, and was installed in 1872.  It was built for the California Powder Works, whose main manufacturing plant was on the east side of the river.  The company operated on that site between 1863 and 1914, after which the site was largely demolished and abandoned.  The property was purchased by a Masonic organization from Fresno, and developed as a summer colony they dubbed "Paradise Park".

The bridge is one of 23 known historic (pre-1955) examples of a Smith truss remaining in the United States, and is the longest and among the best-preserved of those, as determined by a nationwide survey conducted by the National Park Service.  This truss type was marketed on a nationwide scale by the Smith Bridge Company, and was briefly competitive with iron bridges, which were coming to predominate in the landscape.

See also
List of bridges documented by the Historic American Engineering Record in California
List of bridges on the National Register of Historic Places in California
List of covered bridges in California
List of National Historic Landmarks in California
National Register of Historic Places listings in Santa Cruz County, California

References

External links

Road bridges on the National Register of Historic Places in California
Transportation buildings and structures in Santa Cruz County, California
Santa Cruz, California
Historic American Engineering Record in California
National Historic Landmarks in California
National Register of Historic Places in Santa Cruz County, California
Covered bridges on the National Register of Historic Places in California
Wooden bridges in California